Chen Zepeng (born 18 May 1996) is a Chinese footballer who plays for Nanjing City.

Club career
Chen Zepeng started his football career when he was promoted to Chinese Super League side Guangzhou R&F's first team squad in 2015. He transferred to Guangzhou R&F's city rivals Guangzhou Evergrande in July 2015. He made his senior debut on 10 July 2016 in a 4-1 win against Chongqing Lifan, coming on as a substitute for Liu Jian in the 38th minute. Chen was demoted to the reserve team in 2018 season.

In February 2019, Chen was loaned to China League One side Beijing Sport University for the 2019 season.

Career statistics
.

Honours

Club
Guangzhou Evergrande
Chinese Super League: 2016, 2017
Chinese FA Cup: 2016
Chinese FA Super Cup: 2017, 2018

References

External links
 

1996 births
Living people
Association football defenders
Chinese footballers
Footballers from Jieyang
People from Jieyang
Guangzhou City F.C. players
Guangzhou F.C. players
Beijing Sport University F.C. players
Chinese Super League players
China League One players
21st-century Chinese people